Vasily Glukharev (born 15 April 1980) is a Russian ski orienteer. He competed at the 2004 World Ski Orienteering Championships, where he placed 10th in the middle distance, and participated on the Russian relay team. The Russian team consisted of Glukharev, Andrei Gruzdev, Ruslan Gritsan and Eduard Khrennikov, winning gold medals ahead of the Norwegian team.

References

1980 births
Living people
Russian orienteers
Male orienteers
Ski-orienteers
21st-century Russian people